The Republic of Bergamo (Italian: Repubblica Bergamasca) was an ephemeral revolutionary client republic, created on 13 March 1797 by the French army to rule the local administration of Bergamo and its province, during the dissolution of the Republic of Venice. With the Preliminary of Leoben, France and Austria agreed the end of the multi-centennial Venetian rule over the territory between Adda River and Oglio River, together with the Austrian occupation of Istria and Dalmatia.

Defined as "mother-municipality", the administration of the city of Bergamo had to help the creation of "dependent-municipalities" in all the surrounding county. The Republic so became one of the constituent countries of the Cisalpine Republic, established on 29 June 1797.

Establishment of the Revolutionary Republic 
The French troops under General Bareguey entered Bergamo on Christmas Day of 1796, without a fight, according to the Venetian podestà, Count Ottolini, who had agreed to the withdrawal of the Venetian troops.

On 12 March 1797 was proclaimed the Republic of Bergamo. Ottolini, threatened with arrest, left for Brescia, while the new municipality was being elected, consisting of 24 persons, who also established a semblance of an army.

Two days later the Republic voted to be annexed to the Cispadane Republic, and the arms of Venice were removed from the doors of the Venetian walls. The tree of liberty was erected in Piazza Vecchia, as well as in the districts.

The Constitution of 24 March 
On 24 March the Constitution of the Republic of Bergamo was approved.

The new administration included the division of territory into cantons supra. Every territory that wanted to become a town, should have reunited its citizens in a church, under the authority of the priest, and they named a congressman. These, together with the other congressmen of the towns of Cantone, nominated three permanent members of the municipalities of the cantone. Once convened in Bergamo, they should indicate their acceptance of new administrative bodies, bringing the list of representatives of municipalities.
The Municipality of Bergamo was formed by twenty-four states.

On 17 April 1797, wheat rallies general, men with power to vote in every church gathered to elect their representatives.

Subdivision of land 
The republic was divided into 14 cantons, which were divided into towns: 

 City of Bergamo
 Canton of Almenno
 Canton of Alzano
 Canton of Calepio
 Canton of Caprino
 Canton of Clusone
 Canton of Endine
 Canton of Gandino
 Canton of Martinengo or Bolgare; Calcinate; Cavernago; Cividate; Cortenuova; Fara Olivana; Ghisalba; Malpaga; Martinengo; Mornico; Palosco; Romano Telgate
 Canton of Piazza
 Canton of Ponte
 Canton of Seriate
 Canton of Verdello or Albegno; Arcene; Bariano; Boltiere; Ciserano; Cologno; Colognola; Comun Nuovo; Curnasco; Grumello del Piano; Lallio, Levate, Lurano, Mariano, Morengo; Osio Sopra, Osio Sotto; Pognano; Sabbio; Sforzatica; Sforzatica di Oleno ; Spirano; Stezzano, Treviolo; Verdello Minore; Urgnano; Verdello
 Canton of Vilminore
 Canton of Zogno

The counter-revolution in the valleys 
In the valleys, and especially in Imagna Valley, however, took the form a sort of counter-revolution: the Republic appeared to be anti-religious, and especially in the countries of the charisma of the clergy could keep the population from the Venetians. The revolt was quelled, however, within a month 

In this area also began to circulate the tale of the exploits of Pacì Paciana the brigand.

Disestablishment 
With the Treaty of Campo Formio, after about three months after its establishment, the Republic of Bergamo then entered a part of the Cisalpine Republic as Department of Serio.

See also
 Fall of the Republic of Venice
 French client republic
 Transpadane Republic
 Cisalpine Republic

References

Sources
Bortolo Belotti, Banca Popolare di Bergamo ,Storia di Bergamo e dei bergamaschi, Volume 6, Storia di Bergamo e dei bergamaschi
Bortolo Belotti, Edizioni Bolis, 1989, the University of Virginia, 11 Mar

History of Bergamo
History of Lombardy
1797 in Italy
Client states of the Napoleonic Wars
Italian states
Bergamo
Early Modern Italy
Province of Bergamo
States and territories established in 1797
States and territories disestablished in 1797
1797 establishments in Italy
1797 disestablishments in Italy
Fall of the Republic of Venice